The 2003 Plymouth City Council election was held on 1 May 2003 to elect members of Plymouth City Council in England. This was on the same day as the other local elections. The election was the first to be contested under new ward boundaries, and as a result the entire council was up for election. The Labour Party regained control of the council, which it had lost to the Conservative Party at the previous election in 2000.

Overall results

|-
| colspan=2 style="text-align: right; margin-right: 1em" | Total
| style="text-align: right;" | 57
| colspan=5 |
| style="text-align: right;" | 57,303
| style="text-align: right;" |

Ward results

Budshead

Compton

Devonport

Drake

Efford and Lipson

Eggbuckland

Ham

Honicknowle

Moor View

Peverell

Plympton Chaddlewood

Plympton Erle

Plympton St Mary

Plymstock Dunstone

Plymstock Radford

St Budeax

St Peter and the Waterfront

Southway

Stoke

Sutton and Mount Gould

References

2003 English local elections
May 2003 events in the United Kingdom
2003
2000s in Devon